Convergence is an album by Warren Wolf. Featured musicians include guitarist John Scofield, pianist Brad Mehldau, bassist Christian McBride and drummer Jeff “Tain” Watts.

Music and release
The final track is played by Wolf alone. The others feature Wolf with various combinations of four other musicians.

The album was released by Mack Avenue Records on June 10, 2016; it was Wolf's third album for the label.

Reception

The Down Beat reviewer commented that the contributions of Wolf's band were not always as strong as might be expected.

Track listing
"Soul Sisters"
"Four Stars from Heaven"
"King of Two Fives"
"New Beginning"
"Cell Phone"
"Montara"
"Havoc"
"Tergiversation"
"Knocks Me off My Feet"
"A Prayer for the Christian Man"
"Stardust / The Minute Waltz"

Personnel
 Warren Wolf – vibes, marimba, Fender Rhodes, piano
 Christian McBride – bass (tracks 1–3, 5–10)
 Jeff "Tain" Watts – drums (tracks 1, 2, 5–10)
 Brad Mehldau – piano (tracks 1, 2, 4, 5, 7)
 John Scofield - guitar (tracks 1, 7)

References

Mack Avenue Records albums
2016 albums